Agatha Wilhelmina Zethraeus (1872–1966) was a Dutch artist.

Biography 
Zethraeus was born on 23 December 1872 in Amsterdam. She studied at the Dagtekenschool voor den Werkenden Stand. Her work was included in the 1939 exhibition and sale Onze Kunst van Heden (Our Art of Today) at the Rijksmuseum in Amsterdam.

Zethraeus was a student, model and friend of Piet Mondrian. They knew each other from at least 1907 until his death in 1944. She is the subject of his painting Meisje in rood (Girl in red). It is unclear if they had a romantic relationship.

Zethraeus died on 25 July 1966 in Zeist.

Legacy
In 2015 The Mondriaan House held an exhibition Agatha Zethraeus - Vriendin, leerling en model van Piet Mondriaan (Agatha Zethraeus - Friend, pupil and model of Piet Mondrian).

References

External links
images of Zethraeus's work on ArtNet

1872 births
1966 deaths
Artists from Amsterdam
20th-century Dutch women artists